Sai Lub Lip Gloss, is an upcoming  Thai television series starring Pakorn Chatborirak (Boy), Pichukkana Wongsarattanasin (Namtarn), Lapassalan Jiravechsoontornkul (Mild), Itthipat Thanit (God), Kannarun Wongkajornklai (Prang) and Parahma Im-Anothai (Panjan).

Directed by Nattaphong Wongkaveepairot, the series will premiere on Channel 3.

Cast and characters 
Below are the cast of the series:

Main 
 Pakorn Chatborirak (Boy) as Teeraphat Anantathanakarn (Tee) (Sai Lub Team)    
 Pichukkana Wongsarattanasin (Namtarn) as Bararee (Nu Lee) (Pornnapha's daughter)
 Lapassalan Jiravechsoontornkul (Mild) as Nampueng Rungreungrattanakid (Pueng) (Mina's daughter)  
 Itthipat Thanit (God) as Danuphob (Phob) (Online Journalist)
 Kannarun Wongkajornklai (Prang) as Yadpirun Khanjanawithoo (Pon) (Nu Lee's friend/Dr. Ekachai's daughter)
 Kawin Imanothai (Panjan) as Warakorn Raksasat (Korn) (Teeraphat's friend)

Supporting 
 Sirium Pakdeedumrongrit (Ann) as Madame Gee (Owner of GCosMagic)
 Nirut Sirijanya (Ning) Senit (Police)
 Apinun Prasertwattanakul (M) as Mr.Prakarn (Owner of M PARADISE hotel)
 Daraneenuch Pohpiti (Top) as Pornnapa (Jum's elder sister/Nu Lee's mother)
  (Surie) as Saruta Lerngwatcharakul (Ta) (Theeraphat's younger generation)
 Thongchai Thongkanthom (Pingpong) as Pach (Theeraphat's younger generation)
 Vichayut Limratanamongkol (Best) as Tawich Wareechat (Ped) (Theeraphat's younger generation) 
 Sasapin Siriwanij (Pupe) as Mali Chua-Chod (Mali) (Theeraphat's younger generation) 
 Surasak Chaiat (Nu) as Dr.Eakkachai Khanjanawithoo (Pon's father) 
 Nathakron Traikitsyavet (Top) as Tai (Mr.Prakarn's henchman)

Guest Appearances  
  (Dee) as Meena Rungreungrattanakid (Nampueng's mother/Owner of M PARADISE hotel) (3,4,5,6,7,9,11)
 Panchanida Seesaamram (Pang) as Jenjid (Kusuma's sister) (1,2,5,6,7,8,9,10,11)
 Kanokchat Manyaton (Typhoon) as Paded Klomkhao (Ded) (Theeraphat's younger generation/Pon's ex boyfriend) (1,2,3,4,8,9) 
 Supoj Janjareon (Lift) as Dr.Worachai (Panyawee Hospital director) (4,11,12,13,14,15)
  (Golf) as O-Lan (O) (Executive of Oran Accounting Company Limitid.) (1,2,3,11)
 Atichanan Seesaywok (Ice) as Weeriya Anantathanakarn (Wee) (Teeraphat's sister) (1,2,3,5,9,15)
 Nutthanaphol Thinroj (Philip) as Philip (actor) (10)
 JunJera Junpitakchai (JunJi) as Rassamee (Meemy) (Partner Hotel M PARADISE) (7,8,9,10,11) 
 Wisawawit Wongwanlop (Earthz) as Chet (Teeraphat's friend/Police) (3,5,6,9,11)
 Tatsanawalai Ongajitthichai (Hana) as Kusuma (Jenjid's elder sister) (7,10,11)
 Kulteera Yordchang (Unda) as Panyawee (Dr. Worachai's granddaughter) (12,13,14,15)
 Meenay Jutai (Mamameenay) as Jum (Pornnapa's sister/Nu Lee's uncle) (1,2,3,5,8,9,11,13)
 Puchong Yotapitak (Jeab) as Pong (Public News Editing) (3,5,11,15)
 Namo Rebillet (Namo) as Namo (Mercenary/Assassin) (9,10,11,12,13,14,15)
 Alexander Ty Manoiu (Ty) as Dr.Jakrawud  enjai (Jak) (11,12,13,14,15)
 Sasin Chow (Jimmy) as Pornchai Bai-Lay (Porn) (male nurse) (12,13,14)
 Lilly McGrath (Dear) as Journalist (1,3,4,5)
 Anuwan Preeyanont (Kob) as Jidtree (O-Lan's wife) (1,3)
 Atirut Kittipattana (Can) as Journalist (1,3,4,5)
 Veerakarn Puvapiromquan (Puaen) as Puaen (Nampueng's friend) (1,2,5,8,9)
 Achirawit Supavitar (Rojer) as Rojer (Nampueng's friend) (1,2,5,8,9)
 Kittiphong Thumwiphat (Kroy) as Songyod (Owner of THE FRESH GIRL) (4,6,10)  
 Panyanut Jirarottanakasem (Zozeen) as Stuntman (1)
 as Ja Tui (Police) (1,2,3,5,8,9,10,11,12,13,14,15)
 Nat Khaoyuan-Phueng as Police (1,3,11,12,13)
 Chainiran Meksaen as Police (1,3,11,13) 
 Paitoon Song-Ubon as Stuntman (1)
 Chatcharit Wanijphoonphon as Sia (1,3,10)
 as Dan (Danuphob's friend) (1)
 Supaporn Saipanich as Khun Nai (2)
 as Ann (Salesperson GCosMagic) (2)
 Saruudya Aeimsaoad (Kibkiw) as Jib (Salesperson GCosMagic) (2,4,5)
 Maneeyanant Limsawas as Paded's mother (2)
 Panyakorn sornmayura (Pod) as Police (2,14)
 Siriporn Suwanatai as Khun Nai (3)
 Sunthari Chotipun (Nong) as Khun Nai (3)
 Bunsong Keidtad as Police (3,9)
 Rattawat Akkarapisanwattana as Police (3,)
 Mongkol Wongthippayawut as Doctor (11) 
 Tawanrat Pongpo as Ngek-Tor (Mina's house servant) (3,6)
 Pattanaset Chiratharn as Doctor (10,14)
 Mokeewan Phantarak as maid (7)
 Preeyaporn Thongsamut as Mina's house servant (7)
 Weelawu Khemkhaeng as Stuntman (9)
 Thaen Maiyawan as Police (9,11) 
 Paitoon Song-Ubon as Lawyer (11)
 khanuengnuch Choodonwai as nurse (11,12,13,14)
 Peeradech Reingsamran as male nurse (11,12,13,14,15)
 Somjat Thongpreche as Police (11)
 Wiwat Rattapitak as Police (11)
 Kritapas Jantanapoti (Pong) as patient uncle (12,13)
 as Tum Watnon (Pornchai's friend) (12,14)
 Wasan Jadklam as Police (12,15)
 Jatudech Kasemlawan as Police (12,13,14)
 Nat Pattajareonkiat as Journalist (12,14,15) 
 Ngan-Piece Sakultala as hotel staff (13)
 Jatuporn Noo-Neim as Police (13,15)
 as Panyawee's father (13,14)
 as Panyawee's mother (13,14) 
 Chalee Immak as forger of documents (13,14)  
 Donrudee Chana as Mr. Pornchai's grandmother (14)
 Suttipong Payaksan (Oh) as Stuntman (15)
 Thanchanok Toungmukda as Police (15)
 as Senate's wife (15)
 as Nont (Senate's son) (15) 
 Warathanapoj Tantiwiriyangkoon as Sia (15)
 Thantacha Bintasri as villager (15)

References

External links 
 Channel 3

Thai romantic comedy television series
Thai drama television series
Thai action television series
Channel 3 (Thailand) original programming